Taisei may refer to:

 , a historical Japanese name for the "Far West", aka Europe
Taisei (given name)
Taisei (Ryukyu), a chief of the Ryūkyū Islands
Taisei Corporation, a construction company
Taisei Yokusankai, a fascist party of Imperial Japan